Axtell may refer to:

People 
 Axtell (surname)

Places 
Antarctica
 Mount Axtell

 United States
 Axtell, Kansas
 Axtell, Missouri
 Axtell, Nebraska
 Axtell, Texas
 Axtell, Utah
 Axtell, Virginia

See also 
 Axtell High School (disambiguation)